Existentialism is a movement within continental philosophy that developed in the late 19th and 20th centuries. As a loose philosophical school, some persons associated with existentialism explicitly rejected the label (e.g. Martin Heidegger), and others are not remembered primarily as philosophers, but as writers (Fyodor Dostoyevsky) or theologians (Paul Tillich). It is related to several movements within continental philosophy including phenomenology, nihilism, absurdism, and post-modernism.

Pre-existentialist philosophers
Several thinkers who lived prior to the rise of existentialism have been retroactively considered proto-existentialists for their approach to philosophy and lifestyle.

References

 
Existentialists
Existentialists
Existentialists